Verkhniye Kargaly (Ürge Qarğalı) is a rural locality (a selo) and the administrative centre of Kargalinsky Selsoviet, Blagovarsky District, Bashkortostan, Russia. The population was 259 as of 2010. There is 1 street.

Geography 
Verkhniye Kargaly is located 29 km southwest of Yazykovo (the district's administrative centre) by road. Kargalybash is the nearest rural locality.

References 

Rural localities in Blagovarsky District
Belebeyevsky Uyezd